Barbara Everest (19 June 1890 – 9 February 1968) was a British stage and film actress. She was born in Southfields, Surrey, and made her screen debut in the 1916 film The Man Without a Soul. On stage she played Queen Anne in the 1935 historical play Viceroy Sarah by Norman Ginsbury. Her most famous rôle was as Elizabeth the rather deaf servant in Gaslight (1944).

Selected filmography

 The Hypocrites (1916) – Helen Plugenet
 The Man without a Soul (1916) – Elaine Ferrier
 Whosoever Shall Offend (1919) – Maddalena
 Not Guilty (1919) – Hetty Challis
 The Lady Clare (1919) – Alice
 Calvary (1920) – Rachel Penryn
 The Joyous Adventures of Aristide Pujol (1920) – Anne
 Testimony (1920) – Lucinda
 The Bigamist (1921) – Blanche Maitland
 A Romance of Old Baghdad (1922) – Mrs. Jocelyn
 The Persistent Lovers (1922) – Joyce
 Fox Farm (1922) – Kate Falconer
 Lily Christine (1932) – Hempel
 When London Sleeps (1932) – Madame Lamberti
 The Lodger (1932) – Mrs. Bunting
 There Goes the Bride (1932) – Mme. Marquand (uncredited)
 The World, the Flesh and the Devil (1959) – Mrs. Brophy
 The Roof (1933) – Mrs. Foster
 She Was Only a Village Maiden (1933) – Agatha
 The Lost Chord (1933) – Mother Superior
 The Umbrella (1933) – Mrs. Wynne
 Love's Old Sweet Song (1933) – Nurse
 Home Sweet Home (1933)
 The River Wolves (1934)
 The Warren Case (1934) – (uncredited)
 Passing Shadows (1934) – Mrs. Lawrence
 Song at Eventide (1934)
 The Lad (1935) – Mrs. Lorraine
 Regal Cavalcade (1935) – Undetermined Minor Role (uncredited)
 The Passing of the Third Floor Back (1935) – Cook
 Scrooge (1935) – Mrs. Cratchit
 Love in Exile (1936) – Anna
 Men of Yesterday (1936)
 The Man Behind the Mask (1936) – Lady Slade
 Jump for Glory (1937) – Mrs. Nolan
 Old Mother Riley (1937) – Mrs. Briggs
 Death Croons the Blues (1937)
 Trunk Crime (1939) – Ursula
 Discoveries (1939) – Mrs. Venters
 Inquest (1939) – Mrs. Wyatt
 Meet Maxwell Archer (1940) – Miss Duke
 The Second Mr. Bush (1940) – Mrs. Windel-Tod
 The Prime Minister (1941) – Baroness Lehzen (uncredited)
 This Man Is Dangerous (1941) – Mrs. Cardby
 He Found a Star (1941) – Mrs. Cavour
 Commandos Strike at Dawn (1942) – Mrs. Olav
 Forever and a Day (1943) – Girl's Mother in Air Raid Shelter
 Mission to Moscow (1943) – Mrs. Litvinov
 Phantom of the Opera (1943) – Aunt
 Jane Eyre (1943) – Lady Ingraham
 The Uninvited (1944) – Lizzie Flynn
 Gaslight (1944) – Elizabeth
 The Valley of Decision (1945) – Delia
 The Fatal Witness (1945) – Lady Elizabeth Ferguson / Vera Cavanaugh
 Wanted for Murder (1946) – Mrs. Colebrooke
 Frieda (1947) – Mrs Dawson
 The Long Mirror (1948) - Mrs.Tenbury
 Children of Chance (1949) – Francesca
 Madeleine (1950) – Mrs. Smith
 Tony Draws a Horse (1950) – Mrs. Parsons
 An Inspector Calls (1954) – committee member
 The Safecracker (1958) – Mrs. Dawson
 Upstairs and Downstairs (1959) – 2nd Old Lady
 El Cid (1961) – Mother Superior
 Dangerous Afternoon (1961) – Mrs. Judson
 The Damned (1963) – Miss Lamont
 Nurse on Wheels (1963) – Nurse Merrick
 The Man Who Finally Died (1963) – Martha Gelman
 Rotten to the Core (1965) – Mrs. Dick
 Trouble with Junia (1967) – Ada
 Franchette: Les Intrigues (1969) – (final film role)

References

External links
 

1890 births
1968 deaths
English stage actresses
English film actresses
English silent film actresses
20th-century English actresses